Sir Thomas Wharton KB (c. 1615 – 30 October 1684) was an English politician who sat in the House of Commons  in 1659 and 1660.

Wharton was the son of Sir Thomas Wharton of Aske Hall and his wife Lady Philadelphia Carey, daughter of Robert Carey, 1st Earl of Monmouth. His father died in 1622. He was educated at Eton College from 1624 to 1625 and matriculated at Exeter College, Oxford on 3 March 1626, aged 11. He was created Knight of the Bath on 2 February 1626. From 1629 to 1632 he travelled abroad in France and entered Lincoln's Inn in 1638.

In 1659, Wharton was elected Member of Parliament for Westmorland in the Third Protectorate Parliament. He was re-elected MP for Westmorland in 1660 for the Convention Parliament. He was Warden of the Mint along with his son Philip from 1681-1684. 
 
Wharton married firstly in 1645, his cousin Lady Mary Carey daughter of Henry Carey, 1st Earl of Dover and had a son, Philip, and three daughters. She died in June 1672 and he married secondly by licence dated 20 April 1677, Jane Robinson, widow of Leonard Robinson of Ravensworth, Yorkshire and daughter of Rowland Dand of Mansfield Woodhouse, Nottinghamshire. They had two daughters. His elder brother Philip inherited the barony from their grandfather. Thomas Wharton son Philip was the father of Mary Wharton, the divorced wife of James Campbell of Burnbank, Lanarkshire and daughter and heiress of the Hon Philip Wharton, of Edlington, Yorkshire, son of Sir Thomas Wharton, on 17 March 1692. Mary was just 13 years old when she was abducted from her carriage and forced to marry Campbell. Her two-day marriage was annulled by an Act of Parliament in 1690; she married her cousin Robert Byerly

References

External links
"Houghton Hall exhibition: Old masters return after 234 years" - BBC News

 

1615 births
1684 deaths
People educated at Eton College
Year of birth uncertain
People from Westmorland
Place of birth missing
English MPs 1659
English MPs 1660
Knights of the Bath
Members of Lincoln's Inn